João Pedro da Silva Freitas (born 20 August 1998), commonly known as João Pedro, is an East Timorese international footballer who plays as a winger.

Career statistics

International

International goals
Scores and results list Timor-Leste's goal tally first.

References

2000 births
Living people
East Timorese footballers
Association football midfielders
Ubon United F.C. players
UiTM FC players
Thai League 2 players
Malaysia Super League players
Timor-Leste international footballers
East Timorese expatriate footballers
East Timorese expatriate sportspeople in Thailand
East Timorese expatriate sportspeople in Malaysia
Expatriate footballers in Thailand
Expatriate footballers in Malaysia